Calisia Kalisz is a Polish multi-sports club based in Kalisz, most notable for its women's volleyball team, SSK Calisia Kalisz (formerly Winiary Kalisz), playing in the Liga Siatkówki Kobiet (Polish Women's Volleyball League), which folded in 2010. The other large section of the club is the athletics department.

The club also possesses several junior football teams, the senior men's team having folded halfway through the 2014/15 Third Division season.

Honours

Women's Volleyball
 Polish Championship
 1st place
 1996/1997, 1997/1998, 2004/2005, 2006/2007
 2nd Place
 1995/1996, 1998/1999,  2003/2004
 3rd Place
 2000/2001, 2002/2003, 2005/2006, 2007/2008
 Polish Cup
 1995/1996, 1997/1998, 1998/1999, 2006/2007

Association football
Polish Cup Semi-finals – 1955/56
5th place in Second Division – 1958/59

Squad

Women's Volleyball

See also
 Volleyball in Poland
 Sports in Poland

External links
calisiassk.pl (polish)

Defunct football clubs in Poland
Association football clubs established in 1937
1937 establishments in Poland
Kalisz
Sport in Greater Poland Voivodeship
Women's volleyball teams in Poland